23rd (County of London) Battalion, London Regiment was a battalion of the London Regiment (1908-1938), based at the St John's Hill Drill Hall in Lavender Hill, south London. It served as a Tank Regiment during the Second World War, but reverted to Infantry in the Territorial Army in 1956, when it became a Territorial Battalion of the East Surrey Regiment. In 1961 it was amalgamated to form the 4th (Territorial) Battalion of the Queen's Royal Surrey Regiment.

This is not to be confused with 23rd (Service) Battalion, Middlesex Regiment.

History
It originated as the Newington Surry [sic] Volunteers, one of sixty-five volunteer corps reviewed by George III in Hyde Park on 4 June 1799, made up of 120 men in two companies. They were disbanded on the peace of 1815.

A successor unit was raised as a result of the great Volunteer revival of 1859, following fears of a French invasion. The 7th Surrey Rifles (also known as the 7th Surrey Rifle Volunteer Corps) was formed, using Bermondsey Grammar School as its depot. In 1887 it was made the 4th Volunteer Battalion of the East Surrey Regiment. Many members of the Battalion chose to serve in South Africa during the Boer War, and 'I' Company of the 2nd Battalion East Surrey Regiment was composed of members of the 4th Volunteer Battalion.

Territorial Force
When the London Regiment was formed as part of the Territorial Force in 1908, the unit became its 23rd Battalion. It remained in training between the outbreak of the First World War until on 15 March it landed at Le Havre as part of 6th London Brigade, 2nd London Division, which that May was renumbered 142nd Brigade in 47th (2nd London) Division. As such it fought in the Battle of Loos and Battle of the Somme before spending the last three months of 1916 on the Ypres Salient.

In 1917 the battalion was involved in the battles of Messines Ridge and the Bourlon Wood. It also faced the German Spring Offensive of 1918 as well as taking part in the Hundred Days Offensive and the liberation of Lille, before ending the war at Frasnes.

2nd and 3rd Battalions
On the outbreak of World War I a 2/23rd Battalion London Regiment was raised, with the original battalion being renumbered 1/23rd Battalion. Part of 181st (2/6th London) Brigade in 2/2nd London Division (later renamed 60th (London) Division), the new battalion supplied drafts of men to 1/23rd Battalion until autumn 1915, landing in France for active service on 26 June 1916. It remained on the Western Front until October 1916, when it sailed for the Macedonian front, where it spent six months. Its next theatre of war was Palestine, where it remained until May 1918, when it returned to the Western Front for the remainder of the war.

When 1/23rd Battalion sailed for France another draft-finding battalion was formed to free up 2/23rd Battalion for active service. This new battalion was numbered 3/23rd Battalion and remained in Britain throughout the war, including time on coastal defence duties in Norfolk and Suffolk whilst based at Benacre Park near Wrentham, Suffolk in early summer 1918.

Later history 1938-1961
When the London Regiment was dissolved in 1938, the battalion became the 42nd Royal Tank Regiment.

Following the re-establishment of the Territorial Army in 1947 the Regiment remained as 42nd Royal Tank Regiment until 1956, when a reduction in Territorial Army armoured regiments meant the regiment became the 23rd London again. Further reductions in the size of the Territorial Army in 1961 saw the unit merged to become a Territorial battalion of the newly formed Queen's Royal Surrey Regiment.

Battle honours
The battle honours of the regiment were as follows:

South Africa, 1900–02
Festubert, 1915
Loos
Somme, 1916, 1918
Flers-Courcelette
Le Transloy
Messines, 1917
Cambrai, 1917
St Quentin
Ancre, 1918
Bapaume, 1918
Ypres, 1918
Courtrai
France and Flanders, 1915–18
Doiran, 1917
Gaza
El Mughar
Nebi Samwil
Jerusalem
Jericho
Jordan
Tel 'Asur
Palestine, 1917–18

Memorials
Its First World War memorial is located at St Mary's Church, Battersea.

References

Bibliography
 Beckett, Ian F. W., (1982) Riflemen Form: A Study of the Rifle Volunteer Movement 1859–1908, Aldershot, The Ogilby Trusts, .
 Larking, Albert, Capt, (1912) History of the 23rd London Regiment, formerly 4th V.B. East Surrey Regiment, London, County of London Territorial Force Association

23rd
History of the London Borough of Southwark
Military units and formations in Wandsworth
Military units and formations established in 1908
Military units and formations disestablished in 1961